Flexuosa, meaning "full of bends" in Latin, may refer to:

Agonis flexuosa, a species of tree
Deschampsia flexuosa, a species of bunchgrass
Erysiphe flexuosa, a species of plant pathogen
Grevillea flexuosa, a species of shrub
Scutellastra flexuosa, a species of sea snail
Vitis flexuosa, a species of liana in the grape family
Xylosma flexuosa, a species of flowering plant in the willow family

See also
C. flexuosa (disambiguation)
M. flexuosa (disambiguation)